The 2001–02 Ohio Bobcats men's basketball team represented Ohio University in the college basketball season of 2001–02. The team was coached by Tim O'Shea i his first season and played their home games at the Convocation Center. They finished the season 17–11 and 11–7 in MAC play to finish third in the MAC East.

Roster

Preseason
The preseason poll was announced by the league office on October 25, 2001.  Ohio was picked third in the MAC East.

Preseason men's basketball poll
(First place votes in parenthesis)

East Division
 Kent State (31) 313
  (7) 261
 Ohio (5) 231
  (6) 218
 
  107
  52

West Division
  (30) 270
  (17) 248
  (2) 210
  126
  103
 Eastern Michigan 74

Preseason All-MAC 

Source

Schedule and results
Source: 

|-
!colspan=9 style=| Regular Season

|-
!colspan=9 style=| MAC Tournament

|-

Statistics

Team Statistics
Final 2001–02 Statistics

Source

Player statistics

Source

Awards and honors

All-MAC Awards 

Source

References

Ohio Bobcats men's basketball seasons
Ohio
Ohio Bobcats men's basketball
Ohio Bobcats men's basketball